The Norwegian Junior Doctors Association is a vocational organisation in Norway.

It organizes younger physicians, and is a body of the Norwegian Medical Association. It was founded on 5 November 1911.

References

External links
Official site

Trade unions in Norway
Organizations established in 1911
Organisations based in Oslo
1911 establishments in Norway
Medical associations based in Norway